This is a list of locomotives and rolling stock based at the preserved Great Central Railway at Loughborough, Leicestershire, the Great Central Railway (Nottingham) in Ruddington and the Mountsorrel Railway near Leicester.

Mainline steam locomotives
The Great Central has a varied fleet of steam classes representing each of the United Kingdom's "Big Four" railway companies and British Rail. Some of them once worked along the original routes, and others were part of classes that saw service there.

Operational

Non operational

Under overhaul/construction
{| class="wikitable"
! Number & Name
! Type
! Builder
! Photograph
! Livery
! History
! Owner
! Notes
|-
|No. 567
|GCR Class 2 
|N/A
|
|N/A
|Under Construction. The Class 2s were a series of express locomotives built between 1887 and 1892 for use on the MSLR. When the LNER formed they became the D7s, by then they were already obsolete, and all were withdrawn between 1926 and 1939, with no preserved examples. in 2011, a project was launched to build a new member of the class to modern engineering standards for running on the Great Central Railway. No 567 is new build locomotive, with cylinder block and tender chassis already purchased. The total project budget of £450,000 is projected.
|LNER D7 Project
|
|-
|No. 1631
|USATC S160 Class 
|American Locomotive Company
|
|N/A
|Built in 1942. 1631 was one of more than 2000 identical locomotives built for use in Europe during World War II. After the war it was retained for service in Hungary as number 411.388, withdrawn in the 1980s and converted into a static generator before being taken to England in 1995 for storage on the East Lancashire Railway. The locomotive changed hands twice before being moved to Ruddington in 2004. A large collection of parts from two other locomotives are also stored as a source of spares, and restoration is underway. it is currently for sale.
|Private Owner
|
|-
|No. 6990 "Witherslack Hall"
|GWR 6959 Class 
|Swindon Works
|
|BR Lined Green, Early Emblem
|Built in 1948. 6990 was selected as a post-nationalisation locomotive to participate in the Locomotive Exchanges of 1948 on the former Great Central Main Line. Following the trials, it was based at Old Oak Common TMD (81A) until 1966 and was then sold to Woodham Brothers Ltd. It was purchased for preservation and returned to the Great Central in 1975. The locomotive returned to service following her second 10-year overhaul in preservation in October 2015. During her last overhaul, Witherslack Hall'''s Collett tender was exchanged with [[GWR 4900 Class 4930 Hagley Hall|4930 Hagley Hall's]] former Hawksworth tender. Failed with boiler problems in 2022 and has been withdrawn from service early so it can be repaired and returned to service with a new boiler ticket.
|David Clarke Railway Trust.
|
|-
|No. 7027 "Thornbury Castle"
|GWR  GWR 4073 'Castle' 
|Swindon Works
|
|BR Green, TBC (On Completion)
|Built in 1949. 7027's first shed allocation was Plymouth Laira. In March 1959 the engine was re-allocated to Old Oak Common, this being the GWR's biggest shed and for 7027 it would spend most of its working career at 81A before being re-allocated in April 1960 to Worcester. 7027's final shed allocation in August 1963 was at Reading and the engine was withdrawn 4 months later in December 1963 before being moved to Woodham Brothers scrapyard in Barry, South Wales. Arriving there in May 1964.

In August 1972 no 7027 was sold to the then Birmingham Railway Museum and left as the 23rd departure from Barry scrapyard. The engine was however never restored to working order and numerous parts were taken from the engine for use on fellow Tyseley based classmates No. 7029 "Clun Castle" and 5043 "Earl of Mount Edgcumbe". After being purchased by Pete Waterman's Transport Trust, she was stored outside the Crewe Heritage Centre still in her Barry Scrapyard condition. Following the removal of Waterman's railway equipment from the former LNWR site in 2016, she was moved to Peak Rail in April 2016. She was later sold on to Jon Jones-Pratt who planned to restore the engine to modern mainline standards. Owing to commitments elsewhere little progress was made on 7027's restoration and in January 2020 she was once again purchased by another individual with plans to restore the engine to working order, moving to Loughborough where the restoration is well underway. 7027 will however not be restored for mainline operation.
|Private Owner
|
|-
|No. 30777 Sir Lamiel
|LSWR N15 class 
|North British Locomotive Company
|
|BR Lined Green, Early Emblem (on completion)
|Built in 1925. 777 was built by the North British Locomotive Company of Glasgow as one of the later batches of N15s, which became known as "Scotch Arthurs". Based mostly in service at Nine Elms (70A). After the war, it moved to Eastleigh Works (71A), but the Southern Region's electrification policy caused withdrawal in 1959. The NRM had earmarked her for preservation before then and in 1978, it returned to steam, after an extensive overhaul at Hull, Dairycoates (53A). A third overhaul, completed in 2006, has allowed for further operations on the national network. It failed in August 2017 following leaking boiler tubes. Overhaul began in 2020.

The engines overhaul is being done to Network Rail standards as it is intended for the engine to once again run on the mainline on completion of its overhaul.
|National Railway Museum.
|National Railway Museum.
|Cared for by the 5305 Locomotive Association.
|-
|No. 34039 "Boscastle"
|SR West Country Class 
|Brighton Works
|
|BR Green, Late Crest (On Completion)
|Built in 1946. 34039 was based at Stewarts Lane TMD (73A). It was rebuilt at Eastleigh for use in Bournemouth (71B), and was withdrawn from service in 1965. It became the first motive power at Loughborough in 1973. Restoration was not completed until 1992, with many issues causing withdrawal in 2000. A group was formed in 2005 which is now working to return her to working order with a £200,000 overhaul programme. The boiler is off site, and the locomotive has been re-wheeled.
|Boscastle Locomotive Limited.
|
|-
|No. 45491
|LMS Stanier Class 5 
|Derby Works
|
|BR Black, TBC (On Completion)
|Built in 1943. Presently undergoing restoration from Barry Scrapyard condition. The engine's tender has already been completed, with most of the work now concentrated on the boiler, which was removed from the frames in Easter 2012.
|Private Owner
|
|-
|No. 46521
|LMS Ivatt Class 2 
|Swindon Works
|
|BR Lined Green, Early Emblem
|Built in 1953. 46521 was built at Swindon Works as part of a batch of Western Region Ivatt Class 2s. Because of this, it was based at ex-Great Western depots, including Oswestry (89A) and Machynlleth (89C), but was withdrawn from service in 1966 and was sent to Barry scrapyard during 1967. Her first home in preservation was at the Severn Valley Railway from 1971, restored at Bridgnorth in 1974. After several years of work, a complete rebuild including the fitting of off-road tyres was finished at Loughborough in late 2011. After four years sporting Unlined BR Black livery, 46521 was repainted into Lined BR Green in May 2016. Boiler ticket expired in November 2022.
|Loughborough Standard Locomotive Group.
|
|-
|No. 48624
|LMS Stanier Class 8F 
|Ashford Works
|
|BR Unlined Black, Early Emblem
|Built in 1943. Restored at Peak Rail in 2009. After nearly 30 years of work, it was repainted into an LMS maroon livery (only ever worn authentically by express-passenger classes of the company). It ran at the railway for about a year, and was then put on loan to other lines, before being based at the Great Central from early 2011. Boiler ticket expired on 31 July 2019 and is undergoing overhaul.
|48624 Locomotive Company.
|
|-
|No. 63601
|GCR Class 8K 
|Gorton locomotive works
|
|BR Unlined Black, Early Emblem
|Built in 1912. Following completion 63601 was based at Doncaster (36A), primarily hauling slow goods on former Great Central metals. She was withdrawn from service in 1966, as a veteran of two World Wars and three rail companies, but the role the O4s played in the early 20th century caused her to become custodian of the National Collection. An appeal was raised by Steam Railway to return her to steam, which was completed at Loughborough in 2000 and it became a regular and popular performer. Boiler ticket expired in late 2010, but its ticket was extended for another two years before it was withdrawn from service on 24 June 2012 when the extension expired. The overhaul began in 2019.
|National Railway Museum.
|
|-
|No. 70013 "Oliver Cromwell"
|BR Standard Class 7 
|Crewe Works
|
|BR Lined Green, Late Crest (On Completion)
|Built in 1951. 70013 was allocated to the Eastern Region of British Railways on completion with her shed being Norwich (32A) until transfer to the LMR. Thanks to an overhaul undertaken at Crewe, it was the only member of the class operational in 1968 and was selected to haul the Fifteen Guinea Special at the end of steam. The importance of the train meant that it would join the National Collection, and in 2004 was moved to GCR for restoration to celebrate 40 years of the 1T57. Boiler ticket expired in December 2018 and an overhaul began shortly afterwards.

The engines overhaul is being done to Network Rail standards as it is intended for the engine to once again run on the mainline on completion of its overhaul.
|National Railway Museum.
|Cared for by the 5305 Locomotive Association.
|}

Stored

Industrial locomotives
Industrial steam locomotives
Industrial steam locomotives became the mainstay of steam power in early British railway preservation before the Barry Scrapyard veterans were fully restored. Many have huge traction efforts despite their small sizes, making them more than capable of hauling large passenger trains.

Operational

Under overhaul/restoration

Stored

Industrial diesel shunters
In addition to the larger network shunters there is also a modest collection of old industrial designs in varying states of repair.

Operational

Mainline diesel shunters
With period railway scenes in mind and with the cheaper and more effective running costs they can deliver, there are a handful of ex-British Rail diesel shunters based on site. Despite normally working lightly they sometimes feature at special events on passenger and freight traffic.

Mainline diesel locomotives
Both railways have a large collection of heritage diesel locomotives and hold at least two galas each year to run them, in addition to parallel operations with the steam fleet.

Diesel and electric multiple units
Though many are still undergoing long-term restoration, the economic benefits of diesel multiple unit and electric multiple unit trains has been able to be utilised as an easy option for early morning services, off peak services, as a second train or where a steam locomotive is unavailable. Their large windows allow for excellent views of the line and surrounding scenery.

Coaching stock
Whole sets of coaches are in use on a daily basis, from rare LNER postal vehicles and observation cars to the far more common BR Mk1s.

British Railways Mark 1 coaches
The BR Mark 1 entered service in 1951 as a standardisation of passenger stock on all regions. They were built using the best elements of the four railway companies stock creating a very sophisticated design. One of the largest groups preserved is used every operating day at the Great Central Railway as they fit in well with the 1950s-style atmosphere. Those examples which are not in storage or under work are compiled into four uniformal rakes, each with brake and catering facilities.

British Railways Mark 2 and Mark 3 coaches
More modern BR stock is not really at home on a railway with period recreation in mind, but many have found work behind the scenes of the heritage operations. However, the Northern section intends to create a full vacuum-braked Mk2 set to replicate another lost era in British Rail history, taking less-efficient vehicles out of rotation as better examples are brought in.

Great Central Railway coaches
When the Great Central Railway was formed it was billed under the slogan "Rapid travel in luxury", and it was right to do this because it was able to boast the very latest and best in express passenger travel. Today the GCR Rolling Stock Trust based at Ruddington are the owners of the single largest collection of ex-GCR stock in the world.

London, Midland and Scottish Railway coaches
The GCR Plc does not generally rely on LMS stock for passenger trains, but has instead found other uses for what is available. See Coaches of the London, Midland and Scottish Railway.London and North Eastern Railway coaches
RVP Ltd owns and cares for one of the most impressive collections of Gresley Teak-panelled vehicles in the United Kingdom. They intend to return a full rake of varnished teak coaches to service in the coming years. See Coaches of the London and North Eastern Railway.

Other coaches
Some of the stock is completely unique to the railway.

Southern Railway vans
Most heritage railways in the U.K. use parcels and miscellaneous vans for storage purposes, and the Great Central Railway is no exception. See Southern Railway (Great Britain)#Carriages''.

Goods wagons
The GCR has a very extensive range of wagons and goods vans. Many are used as working vehicles on the railway for the transport of rail, ballast and equipment. Still more are used to run demonstration freight trains at the GCR's gala events illustrating a time when most goods were carried by rail.

Cranes

Windcutter

Lengthy trains of mineral wagons were a common feature on British Railways and the Windcutter Project set out to recreate such scenes. The idea of preserving a long train of mineral wagons was first aired in Steam Railway early in 1992 and following an encouraging initial response an appeal was launched in the August issue to purchase suitable wagons for use on the Great Central Railway. The appeal was a huge success, Steam Railway readers and supporters of GCR raised over £14,000 to purchase and restore the wagons.

With the exception of the two un-restored wagons, all the mineral wagons in the ‘Windcutter’ fleet are either fitted with vacuum brake or have been through piped to run in a vacuum braked train. This means that to be fully authentic all the wagons should carry British Railways ‘Bauxite’ livery. However the original aim of the project was to recreate the sight of long trains of unfitted mineral wagons as seen on the GCR in BR days and all over the BR network in the days of steam, and in some areas even as late as the early 1980s. All BR un-fitted freight vehicles were painted grey and hence to recreate the overall appearance of a steam era mineral train the majority of the wagons in the ‘Windcutter’ fleet have been restored in this colour.

Army wagons

Tank wagons

MSLR wagons

LMS wagons

LNER wagons

Southern wagons

British Railway wagons

Former GCR based locomotives
UNFINISHED

Steam locomotives

Diesel locomotives

References

External links

Great Central Railway

Great Central Railway